Maureen Fitch is a plant physiologist who works for the U.S. Department of Agriculture's Hawaii Agricultural Research center. She was part of the team of researchers that engineered papayas resistant to the Papaya ringspot virus (PRSV), and many other papers as well, on this subject, and related ones.

References

External links
Hawaiian Agricultural Research Center profile

21st-century American botanists
Living people
Plant physiologists
Women botanists
21st-century American women scientists
Year of birth missing (living people)